General Smyth may refer to:

Alexander Smyth (1765–1830), U.S. Army brigadier general in the War of 1812
Edward Selby Smyth (1819–1896), British Canadian Militia general
George Stracey Smyth (1767–1823), Norfolk Militia major general
Henry Smyth (British Army officer, born 1816) (1816–1891), British Army general
Henry Augustus Smyth (1825–1906), British Army general
John Rowland Smyth (1803—1873), British Army lieutenant general
Leicester Smyth (1829–1891), British Army lieutenant general
Nevill Smyth (1868–1941), British Army major general
Thomas Alfred Smyth (1832–1865), Union Army brigadier general
Sir John Smyth, 1st Baronet (1893–1983), British Indian Army brigadier general
Sir Thomas Smyth, 2nd Baronet (after 1657–1732), British Army brigadier general

See also
William James Smythe (1816–1887) Royal Artillery general and colonel-commandant
Edward Smyth-Osbourne (born 1964), British Army lieutenant general
Sir James Carmichael-Smyth, 1st Baronet (1779–1838), British Army major general
General Smith (disambiguation)